The Aeros Combat is a family of Ukrainian high-wing, single-place, hang gliders, designed and produced by Aeros of Kyiv and introduced in 2000.

Design and development
The Combat series was conceived as a single-place competition hang glider and as such has gone through successive updates to keep it competitive.

Typical of the line, the Combat 2 13 model is made from aluminum tubing, with the wing covered in Dacron sailcloth. Its  span wing is cable braced, but without a kingpost and upper rigging. The nose angle is 131° and the aspect ratio is 7.95:1.

The wing is also used on the Aeros ANT nanotrike, as well as the Flylight Libelle and Flylight Motorfloater, British ultralight trikes, in its Combat T configuration.

Operational history
In 2005 Oleg Bodnarchuk was the Hang Gliding World Champion, flying a Combat L.

Variants
Combat
Initial model introduced in 2000.
Combat 2 13
Combat 2 14
German DHV 3 certified.
Combat 2 15
Combat L
Improved model introduced in 2003, with lower weight and higher performance.
Combat L 2006
Improved model introduced in 2006, with higher performance.
Combat L 12
Improved model introduced in 2006 for lighter pilots, with higher performance.
Combat L 07 12
Improved model introduced in 2007 with an oval crossbeam, stiffer sprogs and sail design, smaller wing area.
Combat L 07 13
Improved model introduced in 2007 with an oval crossbeam, stiffer sprogs and sail design, mid wing area.
Combat L 07 14
Improved model introduced in 2007 with an oval crossbeam, stiffer sprogs and sail design, larger wing area.
Combat 09 13
Re-designed glider with new sail shape, batten profiles, stiffer leading edge and a stiffer and lighter keel. Wing area of 
Combat 09 13.2
Re-designed glider with new sail shape, batten profiles, stiffer leading edge and a stiffer and lighter keel. Wing area of 
Combat 09 13.5 GT
Version of the Combat 09 with greater aspect ratio of 8.5:1.

Specifications (Combat 2 15)

References

External links

Hang gliders
Combat